Flexopecten flexuosus is a species of bivalve belonging to the family Pectinidae.

The species is found in Western Europe and Northern Africa.

References

Pectinidae